Andrew J. Allen (born 1986) is an American classical and contemporary saxophonist and pedagogue who is currently an assistant professor of music at Georgia College & State University in Milledgeville, Georgia.

Career

He has previously served on the faculties of Midwestern State University, Valley City State University, and Claflin University. He currently serves as a member of the Allen Duo, SAGA Quartet, and the saxophone/percussion duo Rogue Two, with whom he released the album Step Inside: New American Music for Saxophone and Percussion. He has appeared as a soloist with the Wichita Falls Symphony Orchestra, the University of Arkansas Wind Symphony, and the Oklahoma State University Chamber Orchestra and has performed in orchestras in Georgia, Michigan, South Carolina, Tennessee, and Texas. Dr. Allen has performed throughout the United States, Canada, Great Britain, France, and Croatia including appearances at the 16th, 17th, and 18th World Saxophone Congress and conferences of the North American Saxophone Alliance, the College Music Society, and the National Association of College Wind and Percussion Instructors.  He has premiered many new works for the saxophone by such composers as Jay Batzner, Fang Man, Robert Lemay, François Rossé, Jesse Jones, Greg Simon, and Annie Neikirk, among many others.  Dr. Allen holds degrees from Tennessee Tech University, Central Michigan University, and the University of South Carolina, and his teachers include Phillip Barham, John Nichol, and Clifford Leaman, and he has received additional instruction from Joseph Lulloff, Arno Bornkamp, and Claude Delangle, among others.  His articles and reviews have appeared in such publications as the NASA Update, The Saxophone Symposium, The Instrumentalist, Teaching Music, School Band and Orchestra Magazine, JazzEd, The Texas Bandmasters Review, and Saxophone Today, and he is editor of The NACWPI Journal and serves on the editorial board of The Saxophone Symposium.  He currently serves as an Artist-Clinician for the Conn-Selmer Corporation and is a Vandoren Artist.

References 

Classical saxophonists
American male saxophonists
Contemporary classical music performers
Midwestern State University faculty
1986 births
Tennessee Technological University alumni
Central Michigan University alumni
University of South Carolina alumni
Living people
21st-century American saxophonists
21st-century American male musicians